VDT may refer to:
 Video display terminal, or computer terminal
 2-Vinyl-4,6-diamino-1,3,5-triazine (vinyl triazine), an organic compound